Eno is an unincorporated community in Orange County, North Carolina, United States. It is located at the intersection of Interstate 85 and U.S. Route 70.

References

Unincorporated communities in Orange County, North Carolina
Unincorporated communities in North Carolina